Admiral Sir Frederick Charles Learmonth  (14 January 1866 – 3 June 1941) was a Royal Navy officer.

Career
Frederick Learmonth joined the Royal Navy some time before 1887, being promoted from sub-lieutenant to lieutenant on 24 August of that year. In March 1900 he was posted to the survey vessel HMS Research, and on 14 July 1900 he was promoted to commander. He served in that rank for six years, being promoted to captain on 31 December 1906.

Around the same time as this Learmonth received command of the survey vessel HMS Egeria, based in British Columbia. In 1907, Learmonth named the first part of the Gardner Canal Alan Reach, after Admiral Alan, Lord Gardner. Learmonth went on to name a number of locations in and around the canal while completing an extensive survey of the area, often providing names relating to Gardner and men who were serving in Egeria. He continued in command of the survey ship into the following year, surveying Zayas Island. He left the ship later on in 1909.

As a vice-admiral Learmonth served as Hydrographer of the Navy from 1919 to 1924.

Citations

References

  
  
 

1866 births
1941 deaths
Knights Commander of the Order of the British Empire
Companions of the Order of the Bath
Royal Navy admirals
Royal Navy admirals of World War I
Hydrographers of the Royal Navy